The 2020 ACC men's soccer tournament was the 34th edition of the ACC Men's Soccer Tournament. The tournament decided the Atlantic Coast Conference champion and guaranteed representative into the 2020 NCAA Division I Men's Soccer Tournament. The final will be played at Sahlen's Stadium in Cary, North Carolina.

Background 

The format of the tournament was announced in conjunction with all other ACC fall sports on July 29, 2020.

Due to the ongoing COVID-19 pandemic, the format of the 2020 tournament changed multiple times. Originally, the 2020 ACC Tournament was to only feature 4 teams with all matches played at Sahlen's Stadium to create an "isolation zone" (similar to the 2020 NBA Bubble) to minimize the spread of the pandemic. The semifinals were to be played on November 13, 2020, with the final was to be played on November 15, 2020.

On September 4, 2020, the format again changed, expanding the tournament from four to eight teams. The quarterfinals to be played on November 15, the semifinals on November 18, and the championship game on November 22.

Qualification 

Due to the aforementioned COVID-19 pandemic, only eleven teams participated in the regular season, with Boston College electing to not play.  The teams were also divided into a North and South region as opposed to the normal Atlantic and Coastal Divisions.  Eight teams qualified for the tournament, the top four teams in each region.  In the tournament, teams were paired against the opposite region in the bracket.  Higher seeds hosted the quarterfinals and semifinals.

Fall tournament

Quarterfinals

Semifinals

Final

Spring Tournament 
The ACC played a six-game conference schedule in the spring.  The division winners, along with the fall tournament winners, Clemson, played for the ACC's automatic bid to the 2020 NCAA Division I men's soccer tournament.  As a result of Clemson winning the Atlantic division in the spring, Pittsburgh and Clemson played one game to determine the conference's automatic qualifier.

Semifinal

Final

Statistics

Goalscorers 
4 Goals
  Kimarni Smith – Clemson

3 Goals
  Valentin Noel – Pittsburgh

2 Goals
  James Brighton – Clemson
  Cabrel Happi Kamseu – Virginia
  Veljko Petković – Pittsburgh

1 Goal

  Luis Felipe Fernandez-Salvador – Clemson
  Axel Gunnarsson – Virginia
  Jack Lynn – Notre Dame
  Aiden McFadden – Notre Dame
  Stephen O'Connell – Duke
  Mohamed Seye – Clemson
  Kristo Strickler – Virginia Tech
  Jackson Walti – Pittsburgh

All-Tournament team 

MVP in Bold

References 

2020
Tournament
November 2020 sports events in the United States
2020 in sports in North Carolina